Toogoom is a coastal town and rural locality in the Fraser Coast Region, Queensland, Australia.

Geography 

The locality is bounded to the west by Beelbi Creek, to the north by Hervey Bay and to the east by O'Regan Creek. The town centre is at the most northern area where Beelbi Creek enters Hervey Bay with the residential area extending along Beelbi Creek and along the sandy Hervey Bay coast.

Toogoom Lake and a reservoir are to the south of the residential area.

There is a boat ramp into Beelbi Creek at the end of Toogoom Road.

History 

In 1877,  of land was resumed from the Toogoom pastoral run to establish smaller farms. The land was offered for selection on 17 April 1877.

Toogoom State School opened on 30 January 1918 but closed in late 1923 due to low student numbers. It reopened on 30 January 1934 but closed finally in 1939.

Attractions 

The area is known for its sandy beaches. The bay, Beelbi Creek, and Toogoom Lake are all popular for fishing and watersports. Beelbi Creek is good for crabbing.

The area is popular with birdwatchers.

References

External links 

 

Towns in Queensland
Fraser Coast Region
Coastline of Queensland
Localities in Queensland